Lidingö Municipality (Lidingö kommun semi-officially named as Lidingö stad) is a municipality east of Stockholm in Stockholm County in east central Sweden. Its seat is located on the island of Lidingö. The municipality is a part of Metropolitan Stockholm.

It is chiefly located on the island Lidingö, but also incorporates a few smaller islands in the surroundings, most notably the Fjäderholmarna islands within the Stockholm archipelago.

Being an island municipality it has not been amalgamated with any other entities. The small island of Tranholmen has, however, been transferred to Danderyd Municipality. The rural municipality was made a market town (köping) in 1910, a city in 1926 and a unitary municipality in 1971.

The municipality always refers to itself as Lidingö stad ("the City of Lidingö"). This was a decision taken by the municipal assembly (kommunfullmäktige) in 1992.

Geography 

The island Lidingö is connected to the city of Stockholm by the two bridges of Lidingöbron. One is for cars and one for the Lidingöbanan suburban tramway and pedestrians. The bridges lead directly to Ropsten, a station on the Stockholm Metro.

Lidingö is for statistical purposes divided into three localities: Lidingö, Brevik and Sticklinge udde. Because of the strait Lilla Värtan separating the island Lidingö from central Stockholm, Lidingö statistically is not counted as a part of Stockholm.

History 
Lidingö traces its history to at least 600 BC, from when remains have been found. According to legend, Lidingö was a place where the Vikings would gather before setting sails to eastern areas, however no proof have been found to confirm that theory. When the city arms was to be chosen in 1928 a Viking ship became the motif, in the colors of the Swedish flag. Lidingö was first mentioned in writing in 1328, called Lydhingö when the entire island and the farms were owned by Bo Johnsson Grip. On a map from 1661 the island is called Lijdingeöö.

Economy 

The island itself hosts very few industries, a relatively well-known one being AGA AB, which started production on the island in 1912.

Much of the populated land area is built with one-family houses; a total of 36% of the population, or 17,020 people (2006), live in such houses  and, to a large extent, commute to work in Stockholm or other municipalities of Greater Stockholm.

There are also quite a number of conference mansions in the northern parts of the island, providing a part of the industry of Lidingö.

Demography

Population development

Income and Education
Lidingö is one of the wealthiest municipalities in Sweden, with the fourth highest median income per capita. The share of highly educated persons, according to Statistics Sweden's definition: persons with post-secondary education that is three years or longer, is 46.0% – also the fourth highest in the country.

Residents with a foreign background 
On the 31st of December 2017 the number of people with a foreign background (persons born outside of Sweden or with two parents born outside of Sweden) was 10 065, or 21.33% of the population (47 185 on the 31st of December 2017). On the 31st of December 2002 the number of residents with a foreign background was (per the same definition) 6 422, or 15.59% of the population (41 192 on the 31st of December 2002). On 31 December 2017 there were 47 185 residents in Lidingö, of which 8 265 people (17.52%) were born in a country other than Sweden. Divided by country in the table below - the Nordic countries as well as the 12 most common countries of birth outside of Sweden for Swedish residents have been included, with other countries of birth bundled together by continent by Statistics Sweden.

Politics 
The island's politics has traditionally been dominated by the centre-right Moderate Party. They currently run the municipality in coalition with the Christian Democrats and with the Lidingö Party.

Chairman of the municipal executive board is Anna Rheyneuclaudes Kihlman from the Moderate Party.

Election results

Major sporting events
Lidingöloppet, cross-country running, 30 km.
Round Lidingö Race, sailing race round Lidingö counter clockwise, 13,5 M

Culture

Millesgården is an art museum and sculpture garden, located on the island of Lidingö, created by Carl and his wife Olga Milles.

International relations

Twin towns — sister cities
In 1942, Lidingö created a committee to provide support for the people in Lohja (Swedish: Lojo) in the southern part of Finland who suffered badly during World War II. An orphanage was opened in Lidingö and money was collected and sent to Lohja. The orphanage was closed in 1943 as most of the children then had returned to Finland. The money that was left over was used to provide food for the children in Lohja. Lidingö and Lohja still maintain a close relationship.

Another sister city is Alameda, California. The initiative came from Alameda in 1959 and was part of U.S. President Dwight D. Eisenhower's people-to-people-movement. The purpose was to develop better understanding between people from different countries after World War II. Both Alameda and Lidingö are islands with a bridge connecting them to a big city.

As the Baltic countries were liberated from the Soviet Union in 1990-1991, Lidingö looked for a new sister city in the area. Saldus in Latvia was selected. During the years, a number of environmental, cultural and other projects have been accomplished.

See also 
List of islands of Sweden

References

External links 

Lidingö Municipality - Official site

 
Municipalities of Stockholm County
Metropolitan Stockholm